The 1957–58 National Football League was the 27th staging of the National Football League (NFL), an annual Gaelic football tournament for the Gaelic Athletic Association county teams of Ireland.

Dublin beat Kildare's "All-Whites" (the name Lilywhites came later) by five points in the final. The game was level when Dublin scored a controversial goal with five minutes remaining.

Format

Results

Finals

References

National Football League
National Football League
National Football League (Ireland) seasons